Bingley Music Live was an annual music festival held in Myrtle Park, Bingley, West Yorkshire, England. The festival featured a range of musical genres including rock, alternative rock, indie rock and pop music. Organised by City of Bradford Council, it was held on the Saturday and Sunday and since the 2009 event, also on the Friday at the end of August, with one of the days having free admission. 
First held in 2007, it was shortlisted in the ‘Best New Festival’ category of the Virtual Festival Awards.
The ethos of the event was to present high quality music at an affordable price and give a platform for local bands from across West Yorkshire to a large audience.

History

Bingley Music Live evolved from a previous event at the same venue called Music At Myrtle. Music at Myrtle was first held in 1991, had free admission, and featured headline performances by tribute acts and bands from the 1960s and 1970s, such as The Searchers, Alvin Stardust, local band Smokie, Suzi Quatro, Showaddywaddy, Hot Chocolate, Edwin Starr and Boney M.

In 1998, it became a two-day event with the addition of The Pulse Party in The Park (external link). Programming for the Party in the Park was by local radio station, Pulse FM and featured contemporary pop acts, such as Rachel Stevens, McFly, Liberty X, Busted and Gareth Gates. In this format, it continued successfully for eight years.

In February 2007, it was announced that the event was to be cancelled because of escalating costs, shrinking audiences and a decline in support from the music industry for this type of event.
Bradford Council took on the sole responsibility for organising the event giving it a new identity as Bingley Music Live in September that year.

In 2009 the format was a free family night followed by a ticketed Saturday and Sunday lineup.

2007

Saturday 1 September Line Up 
- Free Admission

Sunday 2 September Line Up 
- Ticketed day

2008

Saturday 30 August Line Up 
- Ticketed day

Sunday 31 August Line Up 
- Free Admission

2009

Friday 4 September 
- Free Admission

Saturday 5 September / Sunday 6 September
- Ticketed

2010

2011

2012

2013

2016
2,3 and 4 September.

2017
1, 2 and 3 September.

Main stage

Discovery stage

2018
31 August, 1 and 2 September.

Main stage

References

External links
Bingley Music Live
Spike Island Myspace

Music festivals in West Yorkshire
Bingley
2007 establishments in England
Music festivals established in 2007